Caloptilia iorphna is a moth of the family Gracillariidae. It is known from Java, Indonesia.

The larvae feed on Mucuna species. They mine the leaves of their host plant.

References

iorphna
Moths of Asia
Moths described in 1939